Richard Martin Terwilliger (June 27, 1906 – January 21, 1969) was a pitcher in Major League Baseball. He played for the St. Louis Cardinals in 1932, making just one big league appearance on August 18, 1932.  In his lone MLB appearance, Terwilliger pitched three scoreless innings in a game that the famous Dizzy Dean had started, a 10-4 loss to the Phillies in which Terwilliger pitched the final three frames for St. Louis.

References

External links

1906 births
1969 deaths
Major League Baseball pitchers
St. Louis Cardinals players
Moline Plowboys players
Baseball players from Michigan
People from Kent County, Michigan